Circuit may refer to:

Science and technology

Electrical engineering 
 Electrical circuit, a complete electrical network with a closed-loop giving a return path for current 
 Analog circuit, uses continuous signal levels 
 Balanced circuit, paths are impedance-matched
 Circuit analysis, the process of finding the voltages across, and the currents through, every component in an electrical circuit
 Circuit diagram, a graphical representation of an electrical circuit
 Digital circuit, uses discrete signal levels
 Electronic circuit, contains "active" (nonlinear) electronic components capable of performing amplification, computation, and data transfer
 Asynchronous circuit, or self-timed circuit, a sequential digital logic circuit that is not governed by a clock circuit or global clock signal
 Integrated circuit, a set of electronic circuits on a small "chip" of semiconductor material
 Mixed-signal integrated circuit, contains both analog and digital signals
 Synchronous circuit, a digital circuit in which the changes in the state of memory elements are synchronized by a clock signal
 Printed circuit board, on which electronic components are supported and connected using copper tracks on a non-conductive substrate
 Series and parallel circuits, two ways in which electrical components may be interconnected
 Simple filters, including:
 LC circuit or tank circuit, consisting of an inductance and a capacitance
 RC circuit, comprises a resistance and a capacitance
 RL circuit, comprises a resistance and an inductance
 RLC circuit, comprises a resistance, an inductance, and a capacitance
 Telecommunication circuit, on which information is transmitted
 Nonlinear circuit, a circuit with nonlinear elements.

Mathematics and computer science 

 Circuit (computer theory), a theoretical structure simulating electrical and data paths
 Boolean circuit, a mathematical model for digital logic circuits
 Integer circuit, a mathematical object of computational complexity
 Circuit complexity, a branch of computational complexity theory
 Cycle (graph theory), a closed path, with no other repeated vertices than the starting and ending vertices
 Circuit of a matroid

Other sciences 
 Biological neural network, in neuroscience
 Hydraulic circuit, in fluid mechanics
 Magnetic circuit, in physics, one or more closed loop paths containing a magnetic flux
 Monetary circuit theory, a heterodox theory of monetary economics, also called circuitism
 Pneumatic circuit, in fluid mechanics
 Synthetic biological circuit, in synthetic biology

Arts, entertainment, and media
 Circuit (film), a 2001 gay-themed film set in the world of gay circuit parties
 Mario Kart: Super Circuit, a 2001 Game Boy Advance game and the third game in the Mario Kart series
 "Circuit", a character from the Munna Bhai film series
 Circuit, a character from Power Rangers Time Force

Church 
 Circuit (LCMS), a local grouping of congregations in the Lutheran Church–Missouri Synod
 Methodist Circuit, a form of church governance in Methodism

Government and law 
 Circuit (administrative division), an administrative country subdivision in East Asia
 Circuit court, the name of court systems in several common law jurisdictions

Sports 
 Circuit training, a form of high-intensity aerobics
 ITF Pro Circuit, pro tennis tours of the International Tennis Federation
 ITF Men's Circuit
 ITF Women's Circuit

Transportation and racing 
 Circuit (airfield), also called pattern, a standard path followed by aircraft when taking off or landing
 Circuit, a race track or one complete traverse of a track    
 Formula One circuits (see list of Formula One circuits)
 Kart circuit, a race track designed for kart racing

Other uses 
 Circuit (software), a collaboration service software by Unify
 Circuit, slang for hangouts or events frequented by a given social circle
 Circuit party, a gay dance event

See also 
 
 
 Circuital, a 2011 album by My Morning Jacket
 Cirkut
 The Circuit (disambiguation)